Gottlob Frick  (28 July 1906 in Ölbronn-Dürrn – 18 August 1994 in Muhlacker) was a German operatic bass. He was known for his wide repertory including Wagner and Mozart roles, as well as those of Nicolai and Lortzing.

Career
Frick's teachers included Fritz Windgassen (father and teacher of Frick’s contemporary, the tenor Wolfgang Windgassen).

He was a member of the chorus at the Stuttgart State Opera from 1927 to 1934. His first solo role was in Coburg in 1934–35, followed by Freiburg (1936–40) and Königsberg (1938) where Karl Böhm discovered him and engaged him for the Dresden State Opera in 1941, which was his base for the following decade. In 1950 he moved to the Deutsche Oper Berlin, but his international career took him to all the leading houses in Europe.

His voice was instantly recognizable by its dark timbre, and was aptly described by Wilhelm Furtwängler as 'the blackest bass in Germany' (der schwärzeste Bass in Deutschland): while it had almost unparalleled potential for menace he was equally impressive with nobility.  This made up for the fact that it was somewhat smaller than others such as those of Josef Greindl, Ludwig Weber and Kurt Böhme.

The roles for which Frick was best known were Osmin, Sarastro, Commendatore, Rocco and, above all, the principal Wagner bass roles.  He also performed in operetta, often with Anneliese Rothenberger and Fritz Wunderlich, and often sang Archangel Raphael in Haydn's Creation.

He retired in 1970 from the stage, although a few of his recordings (for instance, as Gurnemanz in the Solti-led Parsifal), were later than that.

Recordings
He is well represented on disc. Among his best-known recordings were Osmin (in The Abduction from the Seraglio) first for Sir Thomas Beecham and again for Josef Krips, Sarastro (in The Magic Flute) for Otto Klemperer and Rocco (in Fidelio) for Klemperer and Ferenc Fricsay.

He also recorded the Hermit (in Weber's Der Freischütz) for Joseph Keilberth and Kaspar for Lovro von Matacic, The Peasant (in Carl Orff's Die Kluge) for both Wolfgang Sawallisch and Kurt Eichhorn, Kecal (in The Bartered Bride), The Commendatore for Giulini, Pogner and King Henry for Rudolf Kempe, King Marke, Daland and the Landgrave for Franz Konwitschny, and Hunding, Hagen and Gurnemanz for Sir Georg Solti.  Several anthology albums of Frick singing arias are also available.

Sources
Warrack, John and West, Ewan (1992), The Oxford Dictionary of Opera, 782 pages,

References

External links
Discography of opera recordings (Capon's Lists of Opera Recordings)
Gottlob Frick Gesellschaft
 On video, recording in studio as Hagen for Solti's famous Ring
 Singing Rossini (audio only)

1906 births
1994 deaths
People from Enzkreis
People from the Kingdom of Württemberg
German operatic basses
Österreichischer Kammersänger
20th-century German male  opera singers
Commanders Crosses of the Order of Merit of the Federal Republic of Germany
Recipients of the Order of Merit of Baden-Württemberg